The Moyle is a rare horse breed. The breed is thought to have origins in the horses bred by Mormon people in Utah during the mid-1800s, and it is believed that the Moyle horse of today was bred by Rex Moyle in the mid 20th century, incorporating Mustangs and Cleveland Bays into the lineage.  DNA studies in the 1990s indicated that the Moyle horse has genetic markers suggesting some common ancestry with the Spanish Horse. Moyle horses often have small frontal skull bosses, referred to as "horns" on their foreheads, a trait seen only in a few breeds, such as the Carthusian horse of Spain. They are also noted for unusual freedom of movement in the shoulder, associated with the positioning of their forelegs a bit farther forward than other breeds.

The Moyle is most commonly brown or bay, but comes in almost all solid coat colors. They rarely have face or leg markings.

References

Horse breeds